Jonathan W. Morrison was a Major League Baseball outfielder for the 1884 Indianapolis Hoosiers and the 1887 New York Metropolitans. In between his two majors stints, he played for the Toledo Avengers and the Toronto Canucks in the minor leagues.

External links

1859 births
19th-century baseball players
Baseball people from Ontario
Canadian expatriate baseball players in the United States
Major League Baseball players from Canada
Major League Baseball outfielders
Indianapolis Hoosiers (AA) players
New York Metropolitans players
Toledo Avengers players
Toronto Canucks players
Rochester Maroons players
Year of death missing
Port Huron (minor league baseball) players